Leccinellum crocipodium is a species of bolete fungus in the family Boletaceae. Fruitbodies contain a benzotropolone pigment called crocipodin.

See also
List of Leccinum species

References

External links

Leccinellum
Fungi described in 1838
Fungi of Europe
Fungi of North America